The Naddle Horseshoe is a group of summits in the English Lake District, south of Mardale valley, Cumbria.  It is the subject of a chapter of Wainwright's book The Outlying Fells of Lakeland.

Wainwright's walk starts at Swindale and ascends Scalebarrow Knott at  before making a clockwise circuit of the valley of Naddle Beck (not to be confused with the better known Naddle Beck which runs north to the River Greta near Keswick).

References

Fells of the Lake District